Çukurbağ  is a village in Mut district of Mersin Province, Turkey. The village is situated in the Taurus Mountains to the east of Mut. The population of the village was 227 as of 2012

References

Villages in Mut District